Wieliszew railway station is a railway station in Michałów-Reginów, Wieliszew Commune, Legionowo County, Poland. It is served by Szybka Kolej Miejska and Koleje Mazowieckie.

References
Station article at kolej.one.pl

External links

Railway stations in Warsaw